Bakara is a rural locality in the District Council of Karoonda East Murray of the Murray and Mallee region of South Australia which was established on 11 November 1999.

The 2016 Australian census which was conducted in August 2016 reports that Bakara had a population of 15 people.

Bakara is located in the local government area of District Council of Karoonda East Murray, the state electoral district of Hammond and the federal Division of Barker.

See also
 Bakara Conservation Park

References

Towns in South Australia